Matteo Perri (born 6 October 1998) is an Italian professional footballer who plays as a defender for Challenger Pro League club Dender EH.

Club career
He made his professional Serie C debut for Viterbese on 10 November 2018 in a game against Matera.

On 5 July 2021, he signed a three-year contract with Serie B club Pordenone. He made his Serie B debut for Pordenone on 3 October 2021 against Vicenza.

On 29 July 2022, Perri moved to Belgian side Virton on a permanent deal. After playing for Les Gaumais in the first part of the 2022–23 season, on 31 January 2023 he moved to fellow Belgian second-tier side Dender EH, signing a contract until June 2024 with the club.

References

External links
 

1998 births
Footballers from Rome
Living people
Italian footballers
Association football defenders
U.C. Sampdoria players
A.S.D. Città di Foligno 1928 players
Ascoli Calcio 1898 F.C. players
U.S. Viterbese 1908 players
Paganese Calcio 1926 players
Ravenna F.C. players
Pordenone Calcio players
R.E. Virton players
F.C.V. Dender E.H. players
Serie D players
Serie C players
Serie B players
Challenger Pro League players
Italian expatriate footballers
Expatriate footballers in Belgium
Italian expatriate sportspeople in Belgium